Yves Fromion (born 15 September 1941) was a member of the National Assembly of France.  He represented Cher department's 1st constituency  from 1997 to 2017 as a member of the Union for a Popular Movement.

References

1941 births
Living people
Union for a Popular Movement politicians
Deputies of the 12th National Assembly of the French Fifth Republic
Deputies of the 13th National Assembly of the French Fifth Republic
Deputies of the 14th National Assembly of the French Fifth Republic